The Isiagu, also called Chieftaincy, is a pullover shirt similar to the dashiki that is worn by Igbo people.  It is usually worn on special occasions like weddings.  The shirt may be long or short sleeved.  Some shirts have gold buttons that are linked by a chain.  There is usually a breast pocket on the front.  Traditionally, the Isiagu was given to a man when he received a chieftaincy title.  The shirt is usually worn with a red fez hat or the Igbo leopard cap. The leopard cap is known as Okpu Agu in the Igbo language.

See also
Igbo people
Dashiki
Fez hat

External links
A chieftaincy celebration 
What is Igbo attire? 
 African Hats 

Igbo clothing
Nigerian clothing
Tops (clothing)